James Irvin Gadsden (born March 12, 1948) is an American diplomat and former U.S. Ambassador to Iceland. 

Gadsden graduated from Harvard University (1970, cum laude) with a B.A. in Economics, MA in East Asian Studies, from Stanford University (1972), and Princeton University (1984) with a Scholar in Economics.

He entered the Foreign Service in 1972 and is now a career member of the Senior Foreign Service.

Posts
Ambassador to Iceland (2002–05)
Special Negotiator for Agricultural Biotechnology (2001–02)
Deputy Assistant Secretary for European Affairs (1997–2001)
Deputy Chief of Mission, Budapest, Hungary (1994–97)
Counselor for Economic Affairs, Paris, France (1989–93)
Economic/Political Officer, US Mission to the EU (1985–89)
European Communities Desk Officer (1981–84)
Staff Assistant to Assistant Secretary for Economic and Business Affairs (1980–81)
Commercial Officer, Budapest, Hungary (1977–79)
Market Research Officer, US Trade Center, Taipei, Taiwan (1974–76)
Political Officer, Office of East Asian Regional Affairs (1972–74)

References

1948 births
Living people
Ambassadors of the United States to Iceland
Harvard College alumni
Princeton University alumni
Stanford University alumni
African-American diplomats
United States Foreign Service personnel
21st-century African-American people
20th-century African-American people